Eugène Manet on the Isle of Wight is an oil on canvas painting by French artist Berthe Morisot, executed in 1875. This painting has the dimensions of 38 by 46 centimeters, and is kept at the Musée Marmottan Monet, in Paris.

History and description
Berthe Morisot married Eugène Manet, brother of the painter Édouard Manet, in December 1874. They had their honeymoon the following year and spent some time at Cowes, a town in the north of the Isle of Wight. This scene was taken from that time.

Eugène Manet looks relaxed, probably from their hotel window, with some vases visible on the parapet, to a scene where two women elegantly dressed in white pass by, while several boats are seen at the shoreline.

References

1875 paintings
Paintings by Berthe Morisot
Portraits of men
Paintings in the collection of the Musée Marmottan Monet